The Boao Forum for Asia (BFA), initiated by 25 Asian countries and Australia (increased to 28 in 2006), is a non-profit organisation that hosts high-level forums for leaders from government, business and academia in Asia and other continents to share their vision on the most pressing issues in this region and the world at large. BFA is modelled on the World Economic Forum held annually in Davos, Switzerland. Its fixed address is in Bo'ao, Hainan province, China, although the Secretariat is based in Beijing. The forum, sometimes known as the “Asian Davos”, takes its name from the town of Boao, located in China's southern Hainan province, which has been the permanent venue for its annual conference since 2002.

The Forum is committed to promoting regional economic integration and bringing Asian countries even closer to their development goals. Initiated in 1998 by Fidel V. Ramos, former President of the Philippines, Bob Hawke, former Prime Minister of Australia, and Morihiro Hosokawa, former Prime Minister of Japan, the Boao Forum for Asia was formally inaugurated in February 2001. The founding of the BFA was driven by the People's Republic of China and founded by 26 Asian and Australasian states on 27 February 2001. The organisation held its first meeting from 12 to 13 April 2002.

Discussions at the BFA focus on economics, integration, cooperation, society and the environment. In the past the forum also addressed China's entry into the World Trade Organization, as well as Southeast Asia's economic crisis during the 1990s. The geopolitical strategy 'China's peaceful rise' was a topic of discussion for the forum in 2004. In addition to its annual meeting, the BFA also sponsors other forums and meetings related to Asian issues.

2008 
The Boao Forum For Asia Annual Conference 2008 was held on 10–13 April 2008. It was attended by heads of government from countries including Australia, Pakistan, Norway and Kazakhstan. It also saw the historic meeting of Taiwan's Republic of China's Vice President-elect Vincent Siew, with People's Republic of China paramount leader Hu Jintao.

2009
The 2009 forum was held in Boao, Hainan, from 17 to 19 April 2009.  The theme was "Asia: Managing Beyond Crisis".

2010
The 2010 forum was held in Boao, Hainan, from 9–11 April 2010.  The theme was "Green Recovery: Asia’s Realistic Choice for Sustainable Growth".

2011 

The Energy, Resources & Sustainable Development Conference for the organisation was held in Perth, Western Australia, Australia between the 11 and 12 July 2011.  The conferences brought together business, industry and political leaders in the region to discuss energy and resource security, development and trade. Australian Foreign Minister Kevin Rudd stated China will invest US 1 trillion dollars abroad and Australia is in a good position to attract capital to develop new mines, infrastructure to service China's insatiable appetite for energy and resources. Rudd also indicated while Chinese capital is essential for Australia's economic future, China needs to do more in relaxing foreign investment rules for Australian companies such as restrictions on types of businesses, equity restrictions and branch or representative office caps.

2013 
This year forum was held from 6 to 8 April in Hainan Province. Bill Gates, George Soros and Christine Lagarde attended. China's paramount leader Xi Jinping delivered the keynote address. This year focus was on "Restructuring".

2014
The 2014 forum was held in Hainan, from 8–11 April 2014, with the official opening address from Chinese premier Li Keqiang on 10 April. The theme of the forum was "Asia's New Future: Identifying New Growth Drivers".

Indian business tycoon Ratan Tata was appointed as a member of the Board of Boao Forum. The post is a rare distinction for an Indian in the Chinese government-backed influential body.

2015
Leaders or deputies from 16 countries, including Armenia, Australia, Austria, China, Indonesia, Kazakhstan, Malaysia, Nepal, the Netherlands, Qatar, Russia, Sri Lanka, Sweden, Thailand, Uganda and Zambia, attended the forum held from 26 to 29 March. The theme of this year forum is "community of shared destiny".

2016
The 2016 forum was held in Hainan, from 22 to 25 March 2016.  Participants at the annual conference focused on Asia's New future: New Dynamics, New Vision and took part in panel discussions.  Chinese Premier Li Keqiang made the keynote speech at the opening of the annual conference.

2017
The 2017 forum was held from 23 to 26 March 2017. Keynote speech was made by Chinese Vice Premier Zhang Gaoli at the opening plenary of the Boao Forum for Asia Annual Conference 2017. The theme for the conference was "Globalization and Free Trade: The Asian Perspectives".

2018
The Boao Forum for Asia 2018 was held between 8 and 11 April at Hainan Province, China. The theme of this year forum was "An Open and Innovative Asia for a World of Greater Prosperity". China's paramount leader Xi Jinping gave the opening speech at the opening ceremony. He said China will open up market including lowering tariffs on imported autos amid increasing trade tensions between US and China.

2019
The 2019 forum was held in Hainan, from 26 to 29 March 2019. Chinese Premier Li Keqiang made the keynote speech at the opening of the annual conference.

2020
The 2020 Forum was cancelled due to COVID-19.

See also
World Economic Forum

References

External links

 

Organizations based in Hainan
Foreign relations of China
Foreign policy and strategy think tanks in China
Political and economic think tanks based in China
Global economic conferences